Rangpur-3 is a constituency represented in the Jatiya Sangsad (National Parliament) of Bangladesh. Saad Ershad is the current MP of this constituency.

Boundaries 
The constituency encompasses Rangpur Sadar Upazila and wards 9 through 33 of Rangpur City Corporation.

History 
The constituency was created for the first general elections in newly independent Bangladesh, held in 1973.

Ahead of the 2014 general election, the Election Commission reduced the boundaries of the constituency. Previously it had also included eight union parishads of Rangpur Sadar Upazila: Chandanpat, Darshana, Mominpur, Rjendrapur, Sadya Pushkarni, Satgara, Tamphat, and Tapodhan.

Ahead of the 2018 general election, the Election Commission altered the boundaries of the constituency by removing wards 1 through 8 of Rangpur City Corporation, and adding Rangpur Sadar Upazila.

The constituency was one of six chosen by lottery to use electronic voting machines in the 2018 general election.

Members of Parliament

Elections

Elections in the 2010s

Elections in the 2000s 
Hussain Muhammad Ershad stood for three seats in the 2008 general election: Rangpur-3, Kurigram-2, and Dhaka-17. After winning all three, he chose to represent Dhaka-17 and quit the other two, triggering by-elections in them. Rowshan Ershad, his wife, was elected in an April 2009 by-election, defeating BNP candidate Rahim Uddin Bharosha.

Elections in the 1990s

References

External links
 

Parliamentary constituencies in Bangladesh
Rangpur District